Charles "Papa" Kwabena Ebo Quansah (born 1964), known as The Accra Strangler, is a convicted Ghanaian serial killer who was arrested in February 2000 and convicted of the strangulation deaths of nine women.

Quansah was initially arrested in 2000 for the murder of his then-girlfriend Joyce Boateng. While in custody, Quansah was subsequently charged with the murder of another woman, Akua Serwaa, who was found strangled near Kumasi Sports Stadium in Kumasi on 19 January 1996, and subsequently confessed to the strangulation deaths of eight women in the capital city of Accra. The deaths of thirty-four women were attributed to a serial killer beginning in 1993.
 
Quansah, a mechanic who lived in the Accra, Ghana neighborhood of Adenta, had been previously under police surveillance as a suspect in the killings.

Police and prison records reveal that Charles Quansah was jailed at the James Fort prisons for the offence of rape in 1986. After completing his sentence, he committed another rape and was jailed for three years at the Nsawam Prisons in 1987. Quansah was imprisoned again for robbery in 1996 at the Nsawam Medium Prisons in near Accra, Ghana. After his release that year he relocated to Accra.

Charles Quansah's trial for the serial killings began on Thursday, 11 July 2002 at the High Court Criminal Sessions, Accra. He was subsequently convicted of the strangulation deaths of nine women and sentenced to be hanged until death.

In 2003, Quansah spoke to the press and denied killing any of the nine women he was convicted of murdering or the further twenty-three women he was suspected of murdering and issued a statement proclaiming that he was tortured whilst in police custody.

See also
List of serial killers by country
List of serial killers by number of victims

References

External links/Sources
Ghana Resource Center, Serial killer Arrested, May 16, 2001
Ghana Resource Center, Serial Killer Speaks Out, August 20, 2003 
Ghana Homepage, General News of Friday, 12 July 2002
Ghana Homepage, Review of Print Media, July 31, 2003
Feminist.com: Women's News
Ghana Homepage, General News of Wednesday, June 9, 2004

1964 births
Ghanaian people convicted of murder
Ghanaian prisoners sentenced to death
Ghanaian serial killers
Living people
Male serial killers
People convicted of murder by Ghana
Prisoners sentenced to death by Ghana
Violence against women in Ghana
History of Accra